The 2005–06 Elitserien season was the 31st season of Elitserien. It ran from September 26, 2005 until March 6, 2006, with the Elitserien playoffs, the 82nd Swedish Championship, to April 18, with Färjestads BK taking the championship.

Regular season

Final standings
GP = Games Played, W = Wins, L = Losses, T = Ties, OTL = Overtime Losses, GF = Goals For, GA = Goals Against, Pts = Points
x - clinched playoff spot, y - clinched regular season league title, e - eliminated from playoff contention, r - play in relegation series

Playoffs
After the regular season, the standard of 8 teams qualified for the playoffs.

Playoff bracket
In the first round, the highest remaining seed chose which of the four lowest remaining seeds to be matched against. In the second round, the highest remaining seed was matched against the lowest remaining seed. In each round the higher-seeded team was awarded home ice advantage. Each best-of-seven series followed a 1–1–1–2–1–1 format: the higher-seeded team played at home for games 2 and 4 (plus 5 and 7 if necessary), and the lower-seeded team was at home for game 1, 3 and 6 (if necessary).

Elitserien awards

See also
 2005 in sports
 2006 in sports

External links 

Hockeyligan.se — Official site
Swehockey.se — Official statistics

Swe
1
Swedish Hockey League seasons